The Armeleuteberg is a  hill south of Wernigerode in the district of Harz in the German state of Saxony-Anhalt. Since 1902 the Kaiserturm, an observation tower, has stood on its summit. Between the Kaiserturm and the Försterplatz car park is the forest inn of the same name.

The Armeleuteberg inn is checkpoint no. 35 in Harzer Wandernadel hiking trail network.

External links 
 The Armeleuteberg inn on the Harzer Wandernadel website

Mountains and hills of Saxony-Anhalt
Wernigerode